Melrose, also known as the Ellen Miyagawa House, is a historic home located near Fork Union, Fluvanna County, Virginia.  It was built in 1813, and is a 2-story, five bay, rectangular brick dwelling in the Federal style.  It sits on an English basement and has a slate covered gable roof with pedimented ends.  A -story frame addition was built in 1978.

It was listed on the National Register of Historic Places in 2000.

References

Houses on the National Register of Historic Places in Virginia
Federal architecture in Virginia
Houses completed in 1813
Houses in Fluvanna County, Virginia
National Register of Historic Places in Fluvanna County, Virginia